This is a list of notable persons who have graduated from the University of São Paulo.

Presidents of Brazil

 Prudente de Morais (1894-1898) - Law
 Campos Sales (1898-1902) - Law
 Rodrigues Alves (1902-1906) - Law
 Afonso Pena (1906-1909) - Law
 Venceslau Brás (1914-1918) - Law
 Delfim Moreira (1918-1919) - Law
 Washington Luís (1926-1930) - Law
 Júlio Prestes (1930) - Law
 José Linhares (1945-1946) - Law
 Nereu Ramos  (1955-1956) - Law
 Jânio Quadros (1961) - Law
 Fernando Henrique Cardoso (1995–2003) - Social Sciences
 Michel Temer (2016-2018) - Law

São Paulo state governors

 Jânio Quadros (1955–1959)
 Abreu Sodré (1967–1971)
 Paulo Maluf (1979–1982)
 André Franco Montoro (1983–1987)
 Mário Covas (1995–2001)
 Cláudio Lembo (2005)
 José Serra (2006–2010)
 Alberto Goldman (2010)

Politicians

 Fernando Haddad - former Minister of Education of Brazil; former mayor of São Paulo (law degree)
 Gilberto Kassab - former mayor of São Paulo (engineering and economics degree)
 Guido Mantega - former Finance Minister of Brazil (economics degree)
 Aloízio Mercadante - current Minister of Education of Brazil (economics degree)
 Antonio Palocci - former Minister of Civil House of Brazil (M.D. degree)
 Rubens Ricupero - former Brazil's Finance Minister of Brazil and Minister of the Environment and Amazonian Affairs (law degree)

Writers
 Clóvis de Barros Filho
 Antonio Candido de Mello e Souza
 Augusto de Campos
 Haroldo de Campos
 Hilda Hilst
 Glauco Mattoso
 Raduan Nassar
 Alcides Nogueira
 Décio Pignatari
 Paulo Emílio Salles Gomes
 Lygia Fagundes Telles
 Antônio Vicente Seraphim Pietroforte
 Ismail Xavier

Scientists and physicians 
 Aziz Nacib Ab'Saber – archaeologist, geographer, geologist and ecologist
 Ennio Candotti – physicist and scientific leader
 Marcelo Damy – physicist and co-discoverer of mesons in cosmic ray showers
 Abraão de Morais – physicist
 Gilberto de Nucci – physician and experimental pharmacologist
 Sérgio Henrique Ferreira – physician and pharmacologist, discovered the active principle of a new drug against hypertension
 José Goldemberg – scientific leader and research scientist
 José Graziano da Silva – agronomist and Director General of the Food and Agriculture Organization (2012-2015)
 Adib Domingos Jatene – physician
 Warwick Estevam Kerr – geneticist, researcher on the biology and genetics of bees
 Marta Mirazón Lahr – human evolutionary biologist and anthropologist
 César Lattes – physicist, co-discoverer of the pi meson
 José Leite Lopes – theoretical physicist
 José E. Moreira – system software architect for Blue Gene/L, the fastest supercomputer in the world
 Dr. Miguel Nicolelis – physician and neurobiological researcher
 Lucila Ohno-Machado – biomedical engineer and chair of the Department of Biomedical Informatics at UC San Diego
 Vivian Pellizari – Antarctic researcher and microbiologist
 Silvano Raia – Brazilian surgeon
 Dr. Renato M. E. Sabbatini – neuroscientist and physiologist
 Oscar Sala – Italian-Brazilian nuclear physicist
 Maria Léa Salgado-Labouriau – Brazilian scientist who specialized in palaeobotany
 Roberto Salmeron – electrical engineer and experimental nuclear physicist
 Mário Schenberg – physicist
 Jayme Tiomno – experimental and theoretical nuclear physicist
 Marcos Troyjo – social scientist, political economist and diplomat
 Drauzio Varella – physician, educator and medical science popularizer
 Mayana Zatz – molecular biologist and geneticist
 Dr. Euryclides de Jesus Zerbini – physician; did the first heart transplantation in Latin America

Others
 João Batista Vilanova Artigas - architect (architecture degree)
 Paulo Autran - actor (law degree)
 William Bonner - journalist (advertising degree)
 Chico Buarque de Holanda - singer (architecture degree)
 Ana Cañas - singer (dramatic arts degree)
 José Celso Martinez Corrêa - playwright (law degree)
 Amyr Klink - sailor and explorer (economics degree)
 Fernando Meirelles - film director, City of God, The Constant Gardener and Blindness (architecture degree)
 Henrique Meirelles - former president of the Central Bank of Brazil (engineering degree)
 Lawrence Lin Murata - technology entrepreneur (engineering dropout)
 Matheus Nachtergaele - actor (dramatic arts degree)
 Sebastião Salgado - photographer and photojournalist (economics degree)
 Nelson Pereira dos Santos - filmmaker (law degree)
 Alexandre Schwartsman - economist (M.S.), former Director of the Central Bank of Brazil
 Sócrates - former Brazil national football team football player (medicine degree)
 Dan Stulbach - actor (dramatic arts degree)
 Marcelo Tas - actor and writer (engineering degree)
 Cilene Victor - journalist, professor, commentator

References 

University
São Paulo